Khorsandi is an Iranian surname. Notable people with the surname include:

 Ehsan Khorsandi (born 1985), Iranian footballer
 Hadi Khorsandi (born 1943), Iranian poet and satirist
 Shappi Khorsandi (born 1973), Iranian-born British comedian and author

Iranian-language surnames